Randazzo may refer to :

People
Randazzo (surname)

Places
Randazzo, town in Sicily, Italy

See also
John, Duke of Randazzo (1342–1348), fourth son of Frederick III of Sicily and Eleanor of Anjou